Deepak Devrani (born 10 December 1992) is an Indian professional footballer who plays as a defender for I-League club RoundGlass Punjab.

Early career
Deepak was about 12 when he first starting kicking the ball. He first started playing football in Jawaharlal Nehru Stadium, Delhi, where his first coach was Nirmal Singh. Then he got selected for D.D.A. Yamuna Nagar where he played under coaches Naveen Khandwal and Ranjith Thapa. In 2007, he moved to the Chandigarh football academy. Since the under-16 level, he has been playing for the national team.

He started his career as a youngster with East Bengal. After not seeing any playing time for East Bengal he jumped at the opportunity to play for Pailan Arrows.

Club career

Pailan Arrows
After years in the East Bengal youth system, Devrani was sent to play for the Pailan Arrows, a team that played in the I-League and aimed at preparing players for the 2018 World Cup. During the 2010-11 season, Devrani played only five times for Indian Arrows. Devrani then missed Pailan's first 20 games of the 2011-12 I-League with a knee injury in which Pailan did not win a single match. He made his debut for the Pailan Arrows on 25 March 2012.

Devrani scored his first goal for Pailan Arrows on 21 September 2012 against Mumbai during the 2012 Federation Cup in which he scored the equalizer for Pailan to help them draw the match 2–2. Devrani then scored his first I-League goal on 1 December 2012 against ONGC F.C. when he scored in the 10th minute to give Pailan the lead in a match that would end in favor of Pailan Arrows 4–1. Devrani however did not end December well as he again had to come off injured for Pailan Arrows in the 2nd minute of the match against East Bengal F.C. on 30 December 2012 as his side went down 3–0.

Sporting Goa
On 18 July 2013 it was confirmed that Devrani has signed for Sporting Goa with Ravi Kumar. 
He made his debut for Sporting Goa in the I-League on 24 October 2013 against Rangdajied at the Duler Stadium; in which he played the whole match and scored one goal in the 30th minute; as Sporting Goa won the match 3-0.

FC Pune City
Devrani signed up with FC Pune City for the 2014 Indian Super League.

Minerva Punjab FC
Devrani signed up with Minerva Punjab FC with their debut season in I-League.

TRAU
On 3 September 2019 Deepak signed a deal and moved to TRAU F.C.

Chennaiyin FC
On 4 August 2021, it was announced that Deepak had signed a one-year deal with the Indian Super League side Chennaiyin FC.

Career statistics

Club

Honours
Minerva Punjab
I-League: 2017–18

Gokulam Kerala
I-League: 2020–21

Individual
I-League Team of the season: 2020–21

References

Indian footballers
Footballers from Delhi
1992 births
Living people
I-League players
Indian Arrows players
India youth international footballers
Sporting Clube de Goa players
Association football defenders
RoundGlass Punjab FC players
FC Pune City players
Mohun Bagan AC players
TRAU FC players
Gokulam Kerala FC players